Bare Skin is a bestseller novel by Zlatko Topčić, published in 2004.

Topčić also wrote the drama of the same name (2007) and the screenplay for the multiple award-winning feature film The Abandoned (2010; working title: Bare Skin), about the same theme.

References

2004 novels
Rape in fiction
Fiction set in the 21st century
Bosnia and Herzegovina culture
Bosnia and Herzegovina literature
Novels set in Bosnia and Herzegovina